Bodø Graduate School of Business (Norwegian: Handelshøyskolen i Bodø) or HHB is a business school and faculty of University of Nordland located at Mørkved in Bodø, Norway. The business school has about 1,000 students and offers both Bachelor, Master of Science and Doctorate education within Business Management, Energy Management and Space Information Management.

History
HHB was created in 1985 and was the second college in Norway allowed to offer postgraduate business administration education in Norway. Before this the only available Master of Business Administration was offered at the Norwegian School of Economics and Business Administration in Bergen. In 1994 a reform to merge the regional colleges to create university colleges was performed, and HHB was made part of Bodø University College (from 2011: University of Nordland). In 2004 the college started undergraduate education in Mo i Rana.

Business schools in Norway
Education in Nordland
Bodø
Organisations based in Bodø